Youlton is a village and civil parish in Hambleton District of North Yorkshire, England. The population of the civil parish at the 2011 census was fewer than 100. Details are included in the civil parish of Aldwark.

History

The rights to the manor in the village used to belong to University College, Oxford. Amongst the previous landowners were the de Ros family. Youlton Hall was used by King James I as an overnight stop between London and Edinburgh.

Governance

The village is within the Thirsk and Malton parliamentary constituency. It also lies within the Tollerton ward of Hambleton District Council and the Easingwold electoral district of North Yorkshire County Council.

Geography

The village lies midway between the River Ure and the River Kyle. Local roads link the village with Alne, North Yorkshire, to the north and Great Ouseburn to the west.

References

External links

Villages in North Yorkshire
Civil parishes in North Yorkshire
Hambleton District